Bikram Lama (born 23 February 1989) is a Nepalese football player. He currently plays for the Three Star Club in Martyr's Memorial A-Division League.

Style of play
Bikram is known for his passing abilities and exquisite sliding tackles, which is why people often call him as 'Tackle Lama' in Nepal. His lanky figure gives him advantage in the air and has been able to make most of it too. Nepal's famous victory over India in 2013 SAFF Championship was inspired by his header, which was tapped in by Anil Gurung after rebound off the crossbar. He has won numerous accolades with his club recent being the first ever National League title for Three Star Club in 2015. Lama played every minute of the 15 league matches he started and missed just one due to yellow card suspension.

Playing career
In the aftermath of the April 2015 earthquake and subsequent May aftershock Lama spent time delivery relief supplies and raising awareness in Sindhupalchowk

Bikram was an integral part of the team that won Bangabandhu Gold Cup 2016 and Gold Medal in the 12th South Asian Games. After his contributions for national sides, he had attracted Indonesian Club Persepam Madura Utama and the club has contracted him.

References

1989 births
Living people
Nepalese footballers
Nepal international footballers
Association football midfielders
Footballers at the 2014 Asian Games
Three Star Club players
Expatriate footballers in Indonesia
Asian Games competitors for Nepal